Christopher Koskei (also written Kosgei, born 14 August 1974) is a Kenyan runner who specialized in the 3000 metres steeplechase. He became known when he, running barefoot, won the silver medal at 1995 World Championships. After that performance, he was not able to improve his PB, having problems in his training in 1996 and 1997. In 1998 he ran only 8:48 minutes, and decided to stop running.

But at the beginning of October 1998, he met in Iten the Italian coach Renato Canova, in Kenya for the first time together with his manager Gianni Demadonna.  After a long talk, he decided to try again, following the new plan from the Italian Coach.

He was able to rebuild his shape, managing a very busy season (with 14 competitions), with the most important peak in the World Championships of Seville, when he became World Champion, four years after the silver of Stockholm.

He is the elder brother of the current world record holder Stephen Cherono (Saif Saaeed Shaheen), who followed the same coach.  Koskei has another brother, Abraham, who likewise follows the family tradition of steeplechasing.

International competitions

Personal bests
3000 metres steeplechase - 8:05.43 (1999)
3000 metres - 7:54.75 min (1995)
5000 metres - 13:40.17 min (1995)
10,000 metres - 28:45.62 min (1996)

See also
List of World Championships in Athletics medalists (men)
List of African Games medalists in athletics (men)
Kenya at the World Championships in Athletics

External links

1974 births
Living people
Kenyan male long-distance runners
Kenyan male steeplechase runners
Kenyan male cross country runners
African Games bronze medalists for Kenya
African Games medalists in athletics (track and field)
Athletes (track and field) at the 1999 All-Africa Games
World Athletics Championships medalists
World Athletics Championships athletes for Kenya
World Athletics Championships winners